This is the list of all programming currently or has aired on the Bangladeshi satellite and cable television channel ATN Bangla.

Original programming

Drama 
 Amader Nishchintopur
 Bhalobashar Rong
 Bhara Bari Bara Bari
 Crime Patrol
 DB
 Doll's House (2007–2008)
 Family Crisis Reloaded
 Hazar Botrish
 Ghar Jamai
 Jiboner Oligoli
 Jole Bheja Rong
 Jyotsna Kaal
 Karo Kono Neeti Nai
 Maago Tomar Jonno
 Nana Ronger Manush
 Nupur
 Ochena Manush
 Path Jana Nai (2010–2011)
 Prohelika
 Sadek Dafadar
 Satti Tarar Timir
 Shopnomongol
 Shunnotaye
 Smritir Alpona Anki (2020–present)
 Soya Panch Arai Lane
 Syed Barir Bou
 Taratari Barabari
 The Challenger
 Uposhonghar
 Volume ta Koman

Children's shows 
 Openti Bioscope

Cooking 
 Farm Fresh Weekly New Recipe
 Starline Rannaghor

Investigative 
 Prapok

Magazine 
 Golpey Anondey ATN Bangla

Musical 
 ATN Unplugged
 Matir Gaan

News 
 ATN Bangla Shongbad
 Off the Record

Reality 
 Agamir Taroka
 Amra Tomaderi
 South Asian Dance Competition

Talk shows 
 Alaap
 Priyojon
 Sense of Humour

Acquired programming 
 Cennet'in Gözyaşları
 Feather Flies to the Sky
 The Lost World

References 

Bangladeshi television-related lists
Lists of television series by network